Jane Mary Elizabeth Holderness-Roddam  (née Bullen; born 1 July 1948, Charmouth, Dorset) is a British event rider, winning Badminton Horse Trials in 1968 (on Our Nobby) and 1978 (on Warrior).  She also won Burghley Horse Trials in 1976 (on 'Warrior'), and competed in the 1968 Summer Olympics in Mexico City, winning team gold for Great Britain, alongside Richard Meade, Reuben Jones and Derek Allhusen.

Currently, Holderness-Roddam owns a stables in North Wiltshire jointly with her husband.

Holderness-Roddam was appointed Lieutenant of the Royal Victorian Order (LVO) in the 1999 New Year Honours, Commander of the Order of the British Empire (CBE) in the 2004 Birthday Honours, and Commander of the Royal Victorian Order (CVO) in the 2020 Birthday Honours.  She was presented with the Queen's Award for Equestrianism in 2009.

References

External links
 

Equestrians at the 1968 Summer Olympics
British event riders
Commanders of the Order of the British Empire
Living people
Olympic equestrians of Great Britain
British female equestrians
English Olympic medallists
Olympic gold medallists for Great Britain
1948 births
People from West Dorset District
Sportspeople from Dorset
Olympic medalists in equestrian
Medalists at the 1968 Summer Olympics
Commanders of the Royal Victorian Order